Oliver Otto (born 21 November 1972 in Germany) is a German retired footballer.

References

German footballers
Living people
1972 births
Association football midfielders
VfB Stuttgart players
SSV Ulm 1846 players
SV Waldhof Mannheim players
SSV Reutlingen 05 players
A.P.O. Akratitos Ano Liosia players
VfL Kirchheim/Teck players